Barry LaShawn Rice Jr. (born September 23, 1987 in Euclid, Ohio) is an American soccer player who currently plays for Akron Summit Assault in the USL Premier Development League.

Club career

On March 25, 2010, D.C. United officially announced the signing of Rice after he spent the off-season with the club. His contract option was not picked up by D.C. United at the end of the 2010 MLS season.

Honors

Individual

University of Kentucky
 C-USA All-Freshman Team: 2006
 C-USA All-Tournament Team: 2006
 C-USA Defensive Player of the Year: 2007, 2008
 C-USA All First-Team: 2007, 2008
 NSCAA All-Region First-Team : 2007, 2008
 NCSAA All-Region First-Team : 2007, 2008

References

External links
DC United player profile
College Profile at the University of Kentucky

1987 births
Living people
American soccer players
Kentucky Wildcats men's soccer players
Chicago Fire U-23 players
D.C. United players
Akron Summit Assault players
Soccer players from Ohio
USL League Two players
Major League Soccer players
Association football defenders